Yazdan Abbasian  is an Iranian midfielder who currently plays for Iranian football club Shahrdari Bandar Abbas in the League 2 Iran.

References

1992 births
Living people
Gahar Zagros players
Esteghlal Khuzestan players
Association football forwards
Iranian footballers
People from Kermanshah Province
21st-century Iranian people